This is a list of Wikipedia articles about curves used in different fields: mathematics (including geometry, statistics, and applied mathematics), physics, engineering, economics, medicine, biology, psychology, ecology, etc.

Mathematics (Geometry)

Algebraic curves

Rational curves
Rational curves are subdivided according to the degree of the polynomial.

Degree 1
Line

Degree 2
Plane curves of degree 2 are known as conics or conic sections and include

Circle
Unit circle
Ellipse
Parabola
Hyperbola
Unit hyperbola

Degree 3
Cubic plane curves include

Cubic parabola
Folium of Descartes
Cissoid of Diocles
Conchoid of de Sluze
Right strophoid
Semicubical parabola
Serpentine curve
Trident curve
Trisectrix of Maclaurin
Tschirnhausen cubic
Witch of Agnesi

Degree 4
Quartic plane curves include

Ampersand curve
Bean curve
Bicorn
Bow curve
Bullet-nose curve
Cartesian oval
Cruciform curve
Deltoid curve
Devil's curve
Hippopede
Kampyle of Eudoxus
Kappa curve
Lemniscate
Lemniscate of Booth
Lemniscate of Gerono
Lemniscate of Bernoulli
Limaçon
Cardioid
Limaçon trisectrix
Ovals of Cassini
Squircle
Trifolium Curve

Degree 5

Degree 6
Astroid
Atriphtaloid
Nephroid
Quadrifolium

Curve families of variable degree
Epicycloid
Epispiral 
Epitrochoid
Hypocycloid
Lissajous curve
Poinsot's spirals 
Rational normal curve
Rose curve

Curves with genus 1
Bicuspid curve
Cassinoide
Cubic curve
Elliptic curve
Watt's curve

Curves with genus > 1
Bolza surface (genus 2)
Klein quartic (genus 3)
Bring's curve (genus 4)
Macbeath surface (genus 7)
Butterfly curve (algebraic) (genus 7)

Curve families with variable genus
Polynomial lemniscate
Fermat curve
Sinusoidal spiral 
Superellipse
Hurwitz surface
Elkies trinomial curves
Hyperelliptic curve
Classical modular curve
Cassini oval

Transcendental curves
Bowditch curve
Brachistochrone
Butterfly curve (transcendental)
Catenary
Clélies
Cochleoid
Cycloid
Horopter
Isochrone
Isochrone of Huygens (Tautochrone)
Isochrone of Leibniz
Isochrone of Varignon
Lamé curve
Pursuit curve
Rhumb line
Sinusoid
Spirals 
Archimedean spiral
Cornu spiral 
Cotes' spiral
Fermat's spiral 
Galileo's spiral 
Hyperbolic spiral 
Lituus 
Logarithmic spiral 
Nielsen's spiral 
Syntractrix
Tractrix
Trochoid

Piecewise constructions
Bézier curve
Loess curve
Lowess
Ogee
Polygonal curve
Maurer rose
Reuleaux triangle
Splines
B-spline
Nonuniform rational B-spline

Fractal curves
Blancmange curve
De Rham curve
Dragon curve
Koch curve
Lévy C curve
Sierpiński curve
Space-filling curve (Peano curve)

See also List of fractals by Hausdorff dimension.

Space curves/Skew curves
Conchospiral 
Helix
Hemihelix, a quasi-helical shape characterized by multiple tendril perversions
Tendril perversion (a transition between back-to-back helices)
Seiffert's spiral 
Slinky spiral 
Twisted cubic
Viviani's curve

Curves generated by other curves
Caustic including Catacaustic and Diacaustic
Cissoid
Conchoid
Evolute
Glissette
Inverse curve
Involute
Isoptic including Orthoptic
Negative pedal curve
Fish curve
Orthotomic
Parallel curve
Pedal curve
Radial curve
Roulette
Strophoid

Applied Mathematics/Statistics/Physics/Engineering
Bathtub curve
Bell curve
Calibration curve
Curve of growth (astronomy)
Fletcher–Munson curve
Galaxy rotation curve
Gompertz curve
Growth curve (statistics)
Kruithof curve
Light curve
Logistic curve
Paschen curve
Robinson–Dadson curves
Stress–strain curve
Space-filling curve

Economics/Business
Contract curve
Cost curve
Demand curve
Aggregate demand curve
Compensated demand curve
Engel curve
Hubbert curve
Indifference curve
J curve
Kuznets curve
Laffer curve
Lorenz curve
Phillips curve
Supply curve
Aggregate supply curve
Backward bending supply curve of labor

Medicine/Biology
Cardiac function curve
Dose–response curve
Growth curve (biology)
Oxygen–hemoglobin dissociation curve

Psychology
Forgetting curve
Learning curve

Ecology
Species–area curve

See also
 Gallery of curves
 List of curves topics
 List of spirals
 List of surfaces
 Riemann surface
 Spherical curve

External links
Famous Curves Index
Two Dimensional Curves
A Visual Directory of Special Plane Curves
Curves and Surfaces Index (Harvey Mudd College)
National Curve Bank
"Courbes 2D" at Encyclopédie des Formes Mathématiques Remarquables
"Courbes 3D" at Encyclopédie des Formes Mathématiques Remarquables
An elementary treatise on cubic and quartic curves by Alfred Barnard Basset (1901) online at Google Books

Lists of shapes